Bath Aqua Theatre of Glass is an arts centre and museum in Walcot Street (The Bath artisan centre) Bath, Somerset, England. It showcases the skills of glassblowers and stained glass artists in demonstrations and also contains historic stained glass exhibits, which appeared on the BBC's Antiques Roadshow. Bath Aqua Glass was founded by Annette Dolan in 1999. The company preserves the art of glassblowing, stained glass, fused glass and glass appliqué. Its mission statement is 'Colouring the world with ancient arts'. It is now run by Annette Dolan, Adrian Dolan and Themis Mikellides.

Amongst its pieces is a William Burges stained glass window discovered deep in the vaults of Bath Abbey in 2009, valued at £10-15,000. 

In addition to making glass ornaments and gifts they also produce stained glass, they give demonstrations of the techniques and opportunities to try out glass blowing.

References

External links
Official site
Memorial glass site

Art museums and galleries in Somerset
Museums in Bath, Somerset
Glass museums and galleries